Eunidia batesi is a species of beetle in the family Cerambycidae. It was described by Olliff in 1889.

Varietas
 Eunidia batesi var. nigromaculata Aurivillius, 1907
 Eunidia batesi var. quadrimaculata Breuning, 1953
 Eunidia batesi var. sexmaculata Breuning, 1939
 Eunidia batesi var. trimaculata Aurivillius, 1915

References

Eunidiini
Beetles described in 1889